Guy Adolphe Ngosso Massouma (born 11 January 1985), known as Guy Ngosso, is a retired former Cameroonian professional footballer who most recently played for US Quevilly-Rouen in Championnat National as a midfielder. He is currently assistant coach with Amiens SC II.

Playing career
Born in Douala, Ngosso began his career with Cotonsport Garoua.

He played on the professional level in Ligue 2 for CS Sedan Ardennes.

In 2014, he played for Luzenac AP in the French third-tier when the club was not allowed to compete in Ligue 2. In September 2014, Luzenac freed him from his contract and he was signed by Ligue 2 team Angers SCO.

In June 2016, Ngosso signed a two-year deal with Amiens SC. After two seasons, including a promotion to Ligue 1, he was released and signed with US Quevilly-Rouen in August 2018.

Release by Quevilly after a year, Ngosso did not find a club during the 2019–20 season, and retired.

Coaching career
After retirement, Ngosso joined the training center of Amiens to work on his coaching qualifications. In August 2018 he was named as assistant to the coach of Amiens SC II in Championnat National 3.

References

External links
 
 

1985 births
Living people
Association football midfielders
Cameroonian footballers
Cameroonian expatriate footballers
Expatriate footballers in France
Ligue 1 players
Ligue 2 players
Championnat National players
Coton Sport FC de Garoua players
CS Sedan Ardennes players
Louhans-Cuiseaux FC players
FC Rouen players
USJA Carquefou players
Angers SCO players
Amiens SC players
US Quevilly-Rouen Métropole players